Barkly is an outback locality in the City of Mount Isa, Queensland, Australia. The locality is on the Queensland border with Northern Territory. In the  Barkly had a population of 28 people.

Geography 
This enables it to have a variety of terrains.

Barkly has the following mountain ranges in the north-east of the locality:

 Ogilvie Range
 Pilpah Range
 Saint Smith Range
with Mount Michael in the west near the Northern Territory border.

The locality is within the Lake Eyre drainage basin.

The land use is grazing on native vegetation.

The Barkly Highway passes through the north-east corner of the locality entering from Gunpowder and exiting to Camooweal. The Camooweal Urandangi Road enters the locality from Camooweal and exits to the south to Piturie.

History 
The Barkly Tableland was named by explorer William Landsborough on 6 December 1861 during his search for Burke and Wills. It was named after the Governor of Victoria Sir Henry Barkly.

The locality was officially and bounded on 23 February 2001.

In the  Barkly had a population of 28 people.

Economy 
There are a number of homesteads in the locality, including:

 Arcadia
 Barkly Downs
 Bullecourt
 Wooroona

Transport 
There are a number of airstrips in the locality, including:

 Barkly Downs airstrip

 Bullecourt airstrip
 Wooroona/Buckley airstrip

Education 
There are no schools in Barkly. The nearest primary schools are Camooweal State School in neighbouring Camooweal to the north and Urandangi State School in neighbouring Piturie to the south. However, due to the size of Barkly, attending these schools would only be feasible for children living in the northern and southern parts of Barkly respectively. Most of the Barkly is outside the range of any primary school and distance education or boarding schools would be the only options. The nearest secondary school is Spinifex State College in Mount Isa to the east, but it would be out of range for almost all Barkly families and again distance education or boarding schools would be the only options. Spinifex State College has boarding facilities.

References 

City of Mount Isa
Localities in Queensland